The March Route of Rochambeau's Army: Scotland Road is a historic road section in Windham, Connecticut.  Extending along Scotland Road (Connecticut Route 14), from itsintersection with Back Rd. to 80 Scotland Road in, it is an evocative portion of the historic march route of the French Army under the  Comte de Rochambeau in 1781 and 1782 during the American Revolutionary War.  The troops camped beside the road within this segment in 1782.  It was listed on the National Register of Historic Places in 2003.

Description and history
Scotland Road is the name given to the main road running east from Windham Center to Scotland. A short distance east of Windham Center, the road descends a slope, lined on both sides with stone walls. There are a few houses on the south side, with fields behind, and much of the north side is an open field. The roadway is now paved, but the stone walls and views of countryside are much as it would have been in 1781-82.

The road is historically significant, because it formed part of the march route taken by French commander Rochambeau's French Army troops in 1781, on their way to Yorktown, Virginia, and also on the route of their return journey in 1782.  On the return trip, the army established a camp in the field on the north side of this road section.

Multiple other properties whose association with Rochambeau's route is known have also been listed on the National Register.

See also
March Route of Rochambeau's army
List of historic sites preserved along Rochambeau's route
National Register of Historic Places listings in Windham County, Connecticut

References

Roads on the National Register of Historic Places in Connecticut
Buildings and structures in Windham County, Connecticut
Connecticut in the American Revolution
Historic places on the Washington–Rochambeau Revolutionary Route
American Revolution on the National Register of Historic Places
National Register of Historic Places in Windham County, Connecticut
Windham, Connecticut